Charlton Hall Plantation House is a historic plantation house located near Hickory Tavern, Laurens County, South Carolina. It was built about 1847, and is a two-story, three bay brick residence in the Greek Revival style. It has a low hipped roof. Also on the property are a contributing blacksmith shop/shed, a smokehouse, and a frame shed.  It was the home of George Washington Sullivan, Sr., (1809-1887), a prominent farmer and public servant of Laurens District before, during, and after the American Civil War.

The 1849 Last Will and Testament of Joseph Sullivan bequeathed “one tract of land,  to contain four hundred acres including the Hickory Tavern” to his minor son, Milton A. Sullivan.  George W. Sullivan was named as the trustee “until my son Milton A arrives of age.”

It was added to the National Register of Historic Places in 1995.

References

Plantation houses in South Carolina
Houses on the National Register of Historic Places in South Carolina
Houses completed in 1847
Greek Revival houses in South Carolina
Houses in Laurens County, South Carolina
National Register of Historic Places in Laurens County, South Carolina
1847 establishments in South Carolina